The Achelous (Akhelôios), also Acheloos, is a river in western Greece. It formed the boundary between Acarnania and Aetolia of antiquity. It empties into the Ionian Sea. In ancient times its spirit was venerated as the river god Achelous.

Herodotus, taking notice of the shoreline-transforming power of the Acheloos River, even compared it to the Nile in this respect:
'There are other rivers as well which, though not as large as the Nile, have had substantial results. In particular (although I could name others), there is the Achelous, which flows through Acarnania into the sea and has already turned half the Echinades islands into mainland.' (2.10, trans. Waterfield)

It is said to have been called more anciently Thoas, Axenus and Thestius.

Course

The river Achelous begins at about  elevation on the eastern slope of Lakmos mountain in the Pindus range, near the village Anthousa in the westernmost part of the Trikala regional unit. One of its first tributaries is the Aspropotamos, meaning the white river.

The river flows generally southwards, and forms part of the boundary between the regional units of Arta and Trikala, which is also the boundary between Epirus and Thessaly. Further downstream, it forms the boundary of Arta and Karditsa, and further of Aetolia-Acarnania and Evrytania. The river runs into the Kremasta reservoir, which is also fed by the rivers Agrafiotis and Megdovas.

On exiting the Kremasta reservoir, the river flows southwest into Aetolia-Acarnania, feeding the Kastraki reservoir, west of the Panaitoliko range.  downstream from this lake, it flows into the Stratos reservoir. Further downstream, it runs through the lowlands west of Agrinio.

Settlements 
In order from upstream to downstream:
 Katafyto
 Gardiki
 Mesochora
 Koryfi
 Myrofyllo
 Petroto
 Grimpiana
 Mesopyrgos
 Neo Argyri
 Tripotamo
 Kastraki
 Stratos
 Palaiomanina
 Gouria
 Neochori

Dams
There are five dams on the river. From upstream to downstream there is the Mesochora Dam which was completed in 2001 but has not impounded its reservoir. Below that is the Sykia Dam which is partly constructed. Further down is the Kremasta (1965), Kastraki (1969) and Stratos Dams (1989).

Acheloos River in mythology

History
In antiquity, the Achelous was the largest and most celebrated river in Greece, rising in Mount Pindus, and after flowing through the mountainous country of the Dolopians and Agraeans, entered the plain of Acarnania and Aetolia near Stratus, and discharged itself into the Ionian Sea, near the Acarnanian town of Oeniadae. It subsequently formed the boundary between Acarnania and Aetolia, but in the time of Thucydides the territory of Oeniadae extended east of the river. It is usually called a river of Acarnania, but it is sometimes assigned to Aetolia. Its general direction is from north to south. Its waters are of a whitish yellow or cream colour, whence it derives a later name of Aspropotamo or the White river, and to which Dionysius Periegetes probably alludes in the epithet ἀργυροδίνης. Periegetes places the sources of the river near a place called Chalcis. It is said to have been called more anciently Thoas, Axenus and Thestius. In the lower part of its course, the plain through which it flows was called in antiquity Paracheloitis after the river. This plain was celebrated for its fertility, though covered in great part with marshes, several of which were formed by the overflowings of the Achelous.

In 1359 the Battle of Achelous between Albanian forces under Peter Losha and the Despotate of Epirus under Nikephoros II Orsini took place near the river Achelous. Nikephoros II was defeated and killed during the battle, and two new states were established in the area, the Despotate of Arta and the Despotate of Angelokastron and Lepanto.

In the 1960s, the Kremasta Dam in the Aitoloacarnania-Evrytania boundary was under construction. The area is not forested. The dam, made of concrete, took years to complete, eventually flooding a portion of the western part of the prefecture of Eurytania. The dam includes a power station with transformer lines in the east. The dam powers electricity for the western part of Greece and the central part. It caused some soil erosion in some flooded valleys. The Kastraki Dam is downstream and was completed in 1969. Downstream of Katsiki, the Stratos Dam was completed in 1989. The arch bridges includes the Karafilio and the Ardanovo.

The Acheloos River Diversion project has been the center of debate since the 1980s. It calls for four large dams, the Sykia, Mesochora, Mouzaki and Pyli, along with a  channel. The goal of the project is to divert  annually from the river west towards the Thessaly plains in order to help irrigate  of mostly cotton crops. Construction on the project has been stalled several times, the latest in 2005, because of environmental and social concerns.

Sources

External links
 Acheloos Ancient Greece Iconography at Beazley Archive (Oxford University)
  (Archived 2009-10-31) - MSN Encarta
 Ecoguides on Achelous
 TV2 Travel Channel on Achelous
 Aspropotamos River
  (in Greek)
  (in Greek)
  (in Greek)
  (in Greek)
  (in Greek) - Trikalasport.gr
  (in Greek)
 

 
 
Landforms of Aetolia-Acarnania
Landforms of Arta (regional unit)
Landforms of Evrytania
Landforms of Karditsa (regional unit)
Landforms of Kastoria (regional unit)
Landforms of Trikala (regional unit)
Rivers of Greece
Rivers of Central Greece
Rivers of Epirus (region)
Rivers of Thessaly
Rivers of Western Greece